Acacia claviseta, also known as the club-tipped whorled wattle, is a shrub belonging to the genus Acacia and the subgenus Lycopodiifoliae that is endemic to north western Australia.

Description
Like most species of Acacia it has phyllodes rather than true leaves. The evergreen phyllodes occur in crowded whorls of 9 to 15. It blooms between February and March and July and August producing yellow flowers.

Distribution
It is native to an area in the Northern Territory and the eastern Kimberley region of Western Australia. It is mostly situated on scree slopes, sand flats, sandstone ridges and sandy lenses among sandstone boulders in scrubland communities.

See also
List of Acacia species

References

claviseta
Acacias of Western Australia
Plants described in 2013
Taxa named by Bruce Maslin
Taxa named by Russell Lindsay Barrett
Taxa named by Matthew David Barrett